George Hays may refer to:

George P. Hays (college president) (1838–1897), president of Washington & Jefferson College
George Washington Hays (1863–1927), Governor of the U.S. state of Arkansas
George Price Hays (1892–1978), United States Army general
George Hays (American football) (1924–2007), former defensive end in the National Football League
George B. Hays, director of the New York bank Consolidated National Bank in 1902

See also
George Hayes (disambiguation)
George Hay (disambiguation)
Hays (surname)